This is a list of paved Florida bike trails. Included in the list are cities that have won awards from the League of American Bicyclists as being a bicycle-friendly community.

Bicycle-friendly community award winners

Silver level
Gainesville
Sanibel
Venice
The Villages

Bronze level
Boca Raton
Orlando
St. Petersburg
Tallahassee
Lakeland
Miami
Broward County
Fernandina Beach
Weston
Key Biscayne
Indian River County
South Lake County
Cape Coral
Naples
Winter Park

Paved bike trails by area

Florida Keys
Florida Keys Overseas Heritage Trail - Florida Keys

Gainesville

Gainesville's trails are connected, and the Waldo Road Greenway, Depot Avenue Trail, Downtown Connector, and Gainesville-Hawthorne trail can be used to provide a  continuous bike trail from the Gainesville Regional Airport to Hawthorne.

Gainesville-Depot Avenue Trail - Gainesville - , paved
Gainesville-Downtown Connector  - Gainesville - , paved (under construction)
Gainesville-Hawthorne Trail State Park - Gainesville - , paved (asphalt 10’ wide)
Kermit-Sigmon Trail - Gainesville - Paved
Gainesville-Waldo Road Greenway - Gainesville - , paved

Jacksonville area
Amelia Island Trail - Amelia Island - , paved (asphalt 10’ wide)
Black Creek Trail - Orange Park, Green Cove Springs - , paved (asphalt 10’ wide)
Jacksonville-Baldwin Rail Trail - Jacksonville, Baldwin - , paved (asphalt 12’ wide)
Keystone Heights multi-use path - Keystone Heights - , paved (asphalt 10’ wide)

Miami Area
Metropath - , paved connected to the South Dade Rail Trail
South Dade Rail Trail - a multi-purpose  asphalt trail from Miami to Homestead, Florida
Black Creek Trail, Miami-Dade at 100 Florida Trails
Miami Beach Boardwalk at 100 Florida Trails
Rickenbacker Trail at 100 Florida Trails

Orlando area
Baldwin Park Trail - Orlando - , paved
Cady Way Trail - Orlando - , paved
Candyland Park Trail - Longwood
Citrus Trail - Seminole County
Country Club Trail - Sanford
Cross Seminole Trail - Seminole County
E. E. Williamson Trail - Sanford
Lake Minneola Scenic Trail and Clermont Trail - Clermont, Orlando - , paved
Little Econ Greenway - Orlando - , paved
Kewannee Trail - Casselberry
Rinehart Road to Riverwalk Connector - Sanford
Riverwalk Trail - Sanford
Seminole Wekiva Trail - Altamonte Springs
South Lake Trail - Clermont
West Orange Trail - Oakland, Winter Garden, Apopka - , paved
Wirz Park Trail- Casselberry

Pensacola area
Pensacola Beach Trail - Pensacola Beach - , paved (asphalt 8’ wide)
Blackwater Heritage State Trail at 100 Florida Trails

Polk County
Auburndale TECO Trail - Auburndale, Florida, also known as the Van Fleet Trail Extension runs for  along Berkley Road from Lake Myrtle Sports Complex to the Polk City, Florida trailhead of the Van Fleet State Trail.
Chain of Lakes Trail - Winter Haven, Florida
Fort Fraser Trail - Runs for  along Highway 98 from Bartow to the Polk State College (Lakeland) campus in Lakeland
General James A. Van Fleet State Trail - Mabel, Polk City, Lakeland - , paved
Lake-to-Lake Trail - A  path in Lakeland which connects Lakes Parker, Wire, Morton, Hunter, Hollingsworth, and John, as well as traversing Lakeland's downtown and historic districts.
University Trail - Lakeland, Florida runs from Polk State College Lakeland campus to Florida Polytechnic University.

Tallahassee area
 Tallahassee-St. Marks Historic Railroad State Trail - 20.5 miles (32.9 km) paved
 Tallahassee-Georgia Florida and Alabama (GF&A) Trail - 2.4 miles (3.9 km) paved

Tampa Bay area
Alderman's Ford Park Trail - Lithia is a  trail accessed from either County Road 39 or Thompson Road.
Bayshore Linear Park Trail  - Tampa also known as "World's Longest Continuous Sidewalk". This , paved (10' wide) trail, runs along Tampa Bay in an entirely urban setting.
Courtney Campbell Causeway - Tampa, Clearwater.  This is a paved trail, minimum of ten feet wide, that parallels the south side of US State Road 60 across Tampa Bay. The Tampa trailhead is at Cypress Point Park, the west side connects to the Pinellas Trail in Clearwater.
FishHawk Trails - Lithia - A network of paved trails connects to Lithia Springs State Park.
Flatwoods Park Trail - Tampa - 8+ miles, paved
Fort De Soto Park - St Petersburg
Good Neighbor Trail - From Brooksville to Croom
Pinellas Trail - Clearwater, St. Petersburg, Dunedin - , paved
Suncoast Trail - Tampa, New Port Richey, Land O' Lakes, Brooksville - 41.3 miles/non-motorized paved trail
Upper Tampa Bay Trail - Tampa - Over  are currently completed; non-motorized paved trail

Other areas
A1A Bicycle and Pedestrian Path - Flagler County - , paved (concrete 10' wide)
Bear Creek Nature Trail - Winter Springs
Blackwater Heritage State Trail - Milton - , paved
Blountstown Greenway Bike Path - Blountstown area
Boca Grande Bike Path - Boca Grande - , paved
Brevard/A1A Bike Path - Melbourne Beach
Cape Haze Pioneer Trail -an 8-mile rail trail in Charlotte County, Florida running from Cape Haze in western Port Charlotte to just north of Placida along the right of way of the former Charlotte Harbor and Northern Railway.
Cross Town Trail - Crystal River
Hollywood Trails - Hollywood
John Yarbrough Linear Park - Fort Myers - , paved
Lake Okeechobee Scenic Trail (LOST trail), a 109-mile multi-use path around Lake Okeechobee
Legacy Trail - Sarasota, Venice - , paved
Nature Coast State Trail - Cross City, Old Town, Fanning Springs, Chiefland, Trenton
Palatka-Lake Butler State Trail
Spring to Spring Trail - West Volusia County - , paved
Suwannee River Greenway at Branford - Branford, Lake City, Live Oak, High Springs - , paved (10' wide)
Venetian Waterway Park - Venice - , paved
Withlacoochee State Trail - Trilby, Croom, Floral City, Inverness, Citrus Springs, Gulf Junction - , paved
Withlacoochee Bay Trail - Yankeetown, Inglis - , paved

See also
Florida
List of cycleways
List of Florida state parks
List of Trails in Brevard County, Florida
Rail trail
Segregated cycle facilities
Trail

References

External links
Bicycle Friendly Community
Rails-to-Trails Conservancy
Bike Florida, Inc.
100 Florida Trails
Florida Greenways and Trails Guide
Florida's Paved Bike Trails - An Eco-Tour Guide - Jeff Kunerth and Gretchen Kunerth

 
Bike
Florida